The Sitagu International Buddhist Academy is a Buddhist missionary university, located in Sagaing, Myanmar. Founded in 1994 by Sitagu Sayadaw Ashin Nyanissara, the academy specializes in the teaching of Buddhist literature, as well as in the training of monks and nuns.

History
Construction of the Sitagu International Buddhist Academy began in 1984, under the direction of the Sitagu Association.

Location 
The university is situated just beneath the Sun U Ponnyashin Pagoda in the narrow plain separating the westernmost spur of the Sagaing Hills and the Minwun ridge. There six-building complex is equipped with classrooms, offices, a research centre, meditation centres, libraries and a number of multipurpose halls.

Programs 
The academy offers the following diploma and degree programs:

Diploma in Language Studies (English, Pali, Sanskrit, or Hindi)
Diploma in Buddhist Studies
B.A. in Buddhist Studies
M.A. in Buddhist Studies
Ph.D. in Buddhist Studies

References 

Buddhism in Myanmar
Buddhist universities and colleges
1994 establishments in Myanmar
Educational institutions established in 1994